TGV Lyria is the brand name used for TGV railway lines connecting France and Switzerland. Lyria is also a corporation that runs the service using the staff of the SNCF in France and Swiss Federal Railways (SBB CFF FFS) in Switzerland – the staff consists of one French and one Swiss train manager on the whole journey.

Corporate status

 Initially, the corporation was a groupement d'intérêt économique (GIE: "group of (shared) economic interest") between SNCF and SBB CFF FFS whose goal was the creation of a TGV service between Gare de Lyon (Paris) and Lausanne/Bern. Today, the corporation is officially a limited company according to French law (Société par actions simplifiée / SAS). SNCF owns 74% of the capital and SBB CFF FFS the remaining 26%.

History

Starting in mid-1961, the route between Paris and Lausanne was operated by the Trans Europ Express Cisalpin trains, which continued on to Milan. On 22 January 1984 this service was replaced by a new TGV service with tri-current locomotives, though service was cut back to Lausanne. In the spirit of the previous European expresses, the trains were christened with names: Champs-Élysées, Lemano, Lutetia and Cisalpin. On 31 May 1987 the train service was rebranded as EuroCity. By this time, a service to Bern was in place as well.

The GIE was created for the first time on 23 May 1993, to operate the segments between Paris and Lausanne/Bern. Service to Geneva was not covered at that time. During the winter of 1995–1996, a single roundtrip per day was extended from Lausanne to Brig to stop at stations serving ski resorts in the Rhône Valley. As was the case with other trains with similar service, these trains were branded as TGV des Neiges. On 28 September 1997 the service was slightly reorganized and rebranded as Ligne de Cœur, with new livery applied to the rolling stock. On 4 March  2002 the name Lyria was applied for the first time to the service. The name then slowly came to stand for all TGV services between France and Switzerland and was applied to Paris–Geneva trains around January 2005. Service to Geneva had existed as part of LGV Sud-Est since 1981.,

At the end of 2005, Lyria transported its 3 millionth passenger.

After the opening of the TGV Est in June 2007, Lyria service between Paris and Zurich began using the newly constructed line instead of the previous route, passing through Strasbourg, Colmar, Mulhouse and Basel. Consequently, service from Paris departed from Gare de l'Est instead of Gare de Lyon until 2011. The service now uses new stock, the TGV POS.,

In February 2011, service improvements were announced, with a fleet of 19 TGV POS trains offering increased frequencies.

Since 12 December 2010, the travel time on the Paris–Geneva line has improved with the reconstruction of the Haut-Bugey line, which connects Bourg-en-Bresse and Bellegarde-sur-Valserine. Until then, only the western part of the line was open (up to Oyonnax), and the project has restored the entire length of the line. Travel time between Paris and Geneva reduced by 30 minutes, to 3 hours and 5 minutes, and track capacity was also increased, allowing nine trains each way per day instead of the previous seven.,

In 2011, with the completion of the LGV Rhin-Rhône, travel time between Paris and Basel/Zurich has been reduced by 30 minutes, passing through Dijon, Mulhouse and Basel. The departure station in Paris has returned to Gare de Lyon.

Visual identity 
The service, first called «Ligne de Cœur» was part of the TGV network originally. The logo evolved as the name Lyria appeared, and as the TGV logo changed. The TGV Lyria trains, originally in the blue and grey TGV livery with an additional red band through the train and the TGV Lyria logo on the bar coaches and the power cars, were re-liveried in 2012 with a variation of the new «Carmillon» TGV livery, except the doors which were repainted in brown instead of the pink present on the re-liveried TGVs and other re-liveried SNCF rolling stock.

Current services
 

During 2020 Lyria runs the following routes, using double-deck trainsets equipped with Wi-Fi:
 Geneva - Marseille: 1 roundtrip per day (in summer months); travel time 3 h 30 min from Marseille.
 Geneva - Paris:  8 roundtrips per day; minimal travel time 3 h 11 min 
 Lausanne - Geneva - Paris: 3 roundtrips per day; minimal travel time 3 h 57 min
 Lausanne - Dijon - Paris: 3 roundtrips per day; minimal travel time 3 h 41 min

 Zürich - Basel – Mulhouse – Paris: 6/5 round trips per day; travel time 4 h 4 min from Zürich and 3 h 4 min from Basel

Rolling stock
For the route between Paris and Lausanne, Bern, and Zurich, new TGV Sud-Est tri-current trains were used, with 7 trains owned by SNCF and 2 owned by CFF (train nos. 112 & 114). Since summer 2006, all trains were renovated to offer a better quality of service.
The maximum speed is attained on the LGV Sud-Est between Aisy-sous-Thil (west of Dijon) and Valenton (near Paris).

Services to Geneva were operated using "classic" TGV Sud-Est equipment; that is, bi-current sets relieved by TGV Duplex.  Trains, with the exception of those running to Geneva, used to carry the Ligne de cœur logo; this has been slowly replaced in 2006 with the TGV Lyria logo and only the old red-border livery remains. The CFF logo was also added to their cars during April 2006.

Since the opening of the LGV Est in 2007, service to Basel/Zurich was run by the new TGV POS as well as renovated TGV Réseau trains. In 2012, the French National Railway Company transferred the totality of the TGV POS fleet to Lyria. In 2019 Lyria increased its offered seat capacity by 30% as it replaced those single-deck trains with 355 seats each by 15 TGV double-deck trainsets offering 507 seats each.

References

External links
TGV Lyria – Official website

TGV
SNCF brands
High-speed rail in Switzerland
High-speed rail in France
SNCF companies and subsidiaries